Elections to Sheffield City Council were held on 6 May 1999 with one third of the council was up for election.  Previous to this election, there had been a by-election in Park, resulting in a Liberal Democrat gain from Labour, effectively cancelling out the concurrent defection of sitting Stocksbridge councillor Alan Pears from the Lib Dems to Labour.  The election saw the Liberal Democrats gain control of the council - the first time since its formation for it not to be controlled by Labour.  The results themselves were more favourable to Labour than recent elections.  However, they suffered double-digit losses, with the Liberal Democrats sustaining their recent election surges.

Election result

|- style="background-color:#F9F9F9"
! style="background-color: " |
| Independent Green
| align="right" | 0
| align="right" | 0
| align="right" | 0
| align="right" | 0
| align="right" | 0.0
| align="right" | 0.0
| align="right" | 41
| align="right" | New
|-

This result had the following consequences for the total number of seats on the council after the elections:

Ward results

Andy Hinman was a sitting councillor for Nether Edge ward

Peter Fox was a sitting councillor for Dore ward

|- style="background-color:#F9F9F9"
! style="background-color: " |
| Independent Green
| Michael Jennings
| align="right" | 41
| align="right" | 1.5
| align="right" | +1.5
|-

Alan Pears was previously elected as a Liberal Democrat councillor

By-elections between 1999 and 2000

References

1999 English local elections
1999
1990s in Sheffield